Ajuga lupulina is a herbaceous flowering plant native to the Himalayan mountain ranges.

Description

This species is found in sub-tropical zones at elevations from 1,300 to 4,500 metres. It grows in grasslands, alongside rivers and within rocky crevices. This plant has medicinal uses, as the leaves can be turned to paste to treat muscular swelling.

References

lupulina
Flora of Asia
Flora of China
Flora of Nepal
Groundcovers